A baptismal font is an article of church furniture used for baptism.

Aspersion and affusion fonts
The fonts of many Christian denominations are for baptisms using a non-immersive method, such as aspersion (sprinkling) or affusion (pouring). The materials vary greatly consisting of carved and sculpted marble, wood, or metal. The shape can vary. Many are eight-sided as a reminder of the new creation and as a connection to the practice of circumcision, which traditionally occurs on the eighth day. Some are three-sided as a reminder of the Holy Trinity: Father, Son, and Holy Spirit.

Fonts are often placed at or near the entrance to a church's nave to remind believers of their baptism as they enter the church to pray, since the rite of baptism served as their initiation into the Church. In many churches of the Middle Ages and Renaissance there was a special chapel or even a separate building for housing the baptismal fonts, called a baptistery. Both fonts and baptisteries were often octagonal (eight-sided), octagonal fonts becoming more common from the 13th century and the rule from the 14th century. Saint Ambrose wrote that fonts and baptisteries were octagonal "because on the eighth day, by rising, Christ loosens the bondage of death and receives the dead from their graves".
Saint Augustine similarly described the eighth day as "everlasting... hallowed by the resurrection of Christ".

The quantity of water is usually small (about ). There are some fonts where water pumps, a natural spring, or gravity keeps the water moving to mimic the moving waters of a stream. This visual and audible image communicates a "living waters" aspect of baptism. Some church bodies use special holy water while others will use water straight out of the tap to fill the font. A special silver vessel called a ewer can be used to fill the font.

The mode of a baptism at a font is usually one of sprinkling, pouring, washing, or dipping in keeping with the Koine Greek verb βαπτίζω. Βαπτίζω can also mean "immerse", but most fonts are too small for that application. Some fonts are large enough to allow the immersion of infants, however.

Regional types
In certain regions of England, a common historic type of font design can be identified. In South East England the "Aylesbury font" can be seen in several churches in Buckinghamshire and the surrounding area. These fonts, which date from the late 12th Century around the years 1170 to 1190, are typically chalice-shaped, ornately carved around the rim with fluting below, and are considered fine examples of English Norman architecture. They are named after the font found in the Church of St Mary the Virgin, Aylesbury. Other identifiable types include the Early English "table-top" font, also found in Buckinghamshire; the "Bodmin font" in Cornwall, the "Seven Sacrament fonts" in East Anglia; and "Chalice fonts" in Herefordshire.

Immersion fonts
The earliest baptismal fonts were designed for full immersion, and were often cross-shaped with steps (usually three, for the Trinity) leading down into them. Often such baptismal pools were located in a separate building, called a baptistery, however, this baptismal practice was then relocated to be administered near the entrance of the church, mostly nearby the main door to signify entrance to the Church. As infant baptism became more common, fonts became smaller. Denominations that believe only in baptism by full immersion tend to use the term "baptismal font" to refer to immersion tanks dedicated for that purpose, however in the Roman Catholic tradition a baptismal font differs from an immersion.

Full-immersion baptisms may take place in a man-made tank or pool, or a natural body of water such as a river or lake. The entire body is fully immersed, dunked, submerged or otherwise placed completely under the water. This practice symbolizes the death of the old nature, as found in Romans .

In the Eastern Orthodox Church, baptism is always by full triple immersion, even in the case of infant baptism (aspersion or pouring is permitted only in extremis). For this reason, Eastern baptismal fonts tend to be larger than Western, and are often shaped like a large chalice (significant since the Orthodox administer Holy Communion to infants after baptism), and are normally fashioned out of metal rather than stone or wood. During the baptismal service, three candles will be lit on or around the baptismal font, in honour of the Holy Trinity. In many Orthodox churches, a special kind of holy water, called "Theophany Water", is consecrated on the Feast of Theophany (Epiphany). The consecration (literally, "Great Blessing") is performed twice: the first time on the eve of the feast, in a baptismal font; the second, on the day of the feast, in a natural body of water.

In the Roman Catholic Church, especially after its Second Vatican Council (1962–1965), greater attention is being given to the form of the baptismal font. Currently, the Roman Catholic Church encourages baptismal fonts that are suitable for the full immersion of an infant or child, and for at least the pouring of water over the whole body of an adult. The font should be located in a space that is visibly and physically accessible, and should preferably make provision for flowing water.

Baptisms of the Church of Jesus Christ of Latter-day Saints are usually undertaken in a simple font located in a local meetinghouse, although they can be performed in any body of water in which the person may be completely immersed. In Latter-day Saint temples, where proxy baptisms for the dead are performed, the fonts rest on the sculptures of twelve oxen representing the twelve tribes of Israel, following the pattern of the Molten Sea in the Temple of Solomon (see 2 Chronicles 4:2-5).

Examples

Aspersion and affusion fonts

Immersion fonts

See also
 Bronze laver (Temple)
 Holy water font
 Nipson anomemata me monan opsin

References

Notes

Citations

Further reading

External links

 Church Furniture article in Christian Cyclopedia
 The Baptismal font of Renier d'Huy in Leige, Belgium

 
Church architecture
Furniture